Mørkved is a neighborhood of Bodø, Norway, about  east of the town center. It is largely a residential area, but also is the site of Bodin Upper Secondary School, a campus of the Norwegian Police University College and Bodø University College. The neighborhood lays along National Road 80. Mørkved Station on the Nordland Line opened in 1987 and was renovated in 2010.

References

Bodø